FIS (International Ski Federation) World Championships may refer to:

FIS Alpine World Ski Championships, biennial international alpine skiing competition
FIS World Junior Alpine Skiing Championships
FIS Freestyle World Ski Championships, biennial international freestyle skiing competition
FIS Freestyle Junior World Ski Championships
FIS Nordic World Ski Championships, biennial international Nordic combined competition
FIS Nordic Junior World Ski Championships
FIS Ski Flying World Championships, biennial international ski flying competition
FIS Snowboard World Championships, biennial international snowboarding competition
World Para Alpine Skiing Championships, biennial international paralympic alpine skiing competition
FIS Speed Ski World Championships, biennial international speed skiing competition
FIS Telemark World Championships, biennial international Telemark racing competition
FIS Grass Ski World Championships, biennial international grass skiing competition